Det är inte regn som faller is a ballad song with lyrics by Ingela "Pling" Forsman, and music by Bobby Ljunggren and Henrik Wikström, and recorded by Swedish singer Sonja Aldén on her 2007 album "Till dig". The single was released for digital download on 1 November 2007, on the Lionheart International record label. The song charted at Svensktoppen, where it stayed for five weeks between 30 December 2007-27 January 2008, peaking at 6th position before leaving the chart.

References

2007 singles
Sonja Aldén songs
Songs with lyrics by Ingela Forsman
Songs written by Bobby Ljunggren
Songs written by Henrik Wikström
Swedish-language songs
2007 songs